Arthur Henry Austen-Leigh (28 February 1836 – 29 July 1917) was an English Anglican vicar, cricketer and association footballer.

Austen-Leigh was born at Speen, Berkshire in February 1836, to Emma Smith and her husband, the vicar, James Edward Austen-Leigh, who was a nephew to the novelist Jane Austen. He was educated at both Radley College and Cheltenham College, before studying law and theology at Balliol College, Oxford.

While studying at Balliol in 1857, Austen-Leigh played first-class cricket for the Gentlemen of England against the Gentlemen of Kent and Sussex at Lord's. He batted once in the match. Opening the batting, he made 34 runs, before being dismissed bowled by Edward Tredcroft.

He graduated from Balliol with an MA, becoming a curate in his fathers parish. A keen sportsman, Austen-Leigh played football for Maidenhead from 1871 to 1874, including playing in the inaugural FA Cup. He later served as the rector for Winterbourne, Gloucestershire, from 1875 to 1890, and from 1890 to 1911 he served as the vicar for Wargrave, Berkshire. He died at Reading on 29 July 1917. He was married to Mary Violet Hall Say, the daughter of Sir Richard Hall-Say, with the couple having two sons.

References

External links
Arthur Austen-Leigh at ESPNcricinfo
Arthur Austen-Leigh at CricketArchive

1836 births
1917 deaths
People from Speen, Berkshire
People educated at Cheltenham College
People educated at Radley College
Alumni of Balliol College, Oxford
English cricketers
Gentlemen of England cricketers
English footballers
Maidenhead United F.C. players
19th-century English Anglican priests
20th-century English Anglican priests
Austen family
Jane Austen
Association footballers not categorized by position